The rose-throated becard (Pachyramphus aglaiae) is a medium-sized member of the family Tityridae. Its genus, Pachyramphus, has traditionally been placed in Cotingidae or Tyrannidae, but evidence strongly suggest it is better placed in Tityridae. This species was named in honour of Aglaé Brelay.

Taxonomy and systematics 
The classification of the rose-throated becard was long controversial, with taxonomists arguing either that it was a cotinga or a tyrant flycatcher. However, genetic evidence indicates that it is in a separate family altogether.

Distribution and habitat

Rose-throated becards usually occur in riparian areas of pine-oak woodlands and evergreen forest. They breed from south-easternmost Arizona and extreme southern Texas of the United States to western Panama. Breeding is local and sporadic in the US, and becomes more regular in Mexico. Birds are normally permanent residents, but birds found in the United States generally migrate for the winter.

Description
The most distinguishing characteristics of this bird is the rose-colored neck bib found in adult males. Males are mostly gray in color, with a contrasting darker upperside and a pale gray underside. Males also show a black crown. Females are mostly brown in color, with a rusty brown upperside, and a pale buffy underside. The crown is a dark gray, not nearly as stunning as the males. Its usual call is a mournful "seeeeuuuwww".

Behaviour

Breeding
Most breeding activity runs from May to July, but the season may be delayed at high elevation. They make a domed, pendulous nest that hangs from a high tree branch. Three to six eggs are laid, with great variation in color including off-white, light purple, olive, and pinkish. Eggs have scrawling, spotted, markings at the larger end.

Feeding
The becard feeds primarily on insects, which it will glean from the vegetation, but captures some in flight as well. They will also take berries and seeds.

Status 
They are abundant in their range, and are thus considering a species of least concern. General data on their population is unknown, but they are declining at the edge of their range due to human activity.

References

Further reading

rose-throated becard
Native birds of the Southwestern United States
Birds of the Rio Grande valleys
Birds of Central America
rose-throated becard